Portugal was a pioneer in the process of abolition of capital punishment. No executions have been carried out since 1846, with the formal abolishment of capital punishment for civil crimes occurring in 1867.

The method of capital punishment used in Portugal was by hanging. 
Portugal was the first country in the world to begin the process to abolish the death penalty, abolishing it in stages – for political crimes in 1852, for all crimes except the military in 1867, and for all crimes in 1911. In 1916, Portugal entered in World War I and it was re-established for military crimes in wartime with a foreign country in the theatre of war. With the new Constitution in 1976, it was again abolished for all crimes.

The last execution in Portugal took place in Lagos in 1846. The execution of a soldier of the Portuguese Expeditionary Corps carried out in France during World War I was poorly documented until recently; soldier João Augusto Ferreira de Almeida, executed by firing squad on 16 September 1917, was issued a "moral rehabilitation" by the Council of Ministers and the President of the Republic (as Supreme Commander of the Armed Forces) in 2017 (100th anniversary of his execution and 150th anniversary of the end of capital punishment for civil crimes in Portugal) — the action was purely symbolic, and not a reappreciation of the facts of the case, an exoneration, or a pardon; merely the "rehabilitation of the memory of a soldier convicted to a sentence contrary to human rights and the values and principles that have been long ingrained in Portuguese society."

In the 2008 European Values Study (EVS), 51.6% of respondents in Portugal said the death penalty can never be justified, while only 1.5% said it can be always justified.

Politics
Today, most political circles are opposed to the idea of reintroducing the death penalty, although it has support from some members of the Chega, a far right, anti-immigration and nationalist political party. In a 2020 Chega party referendum, 44% voted in favour of death penalty for crimes such as terrorism or child abuse.

References

Portugal
Capital punishment
Capital punishment
Capital punishment
Death in Portugal
1911 disestablishments
1867 disestablishments
1976 disestablishments in Portugal